"The Ivory Tower" is the second episode of the first season of the HBO television series Boardwalk Empire, which originally aired September 26, 2010. The episode was written by series creator and executive producer Terence Winter and directed by executive producer Tim Van Patten.

Nucky is visited by federal agent Nelson Van Alden, who begins to suspect that Nucky might be a bigger fish than the gangsters he has been investigating. Jimmy is forced to pay Nucky a larger sum of money as compensation for the loss of Rothstein's alcohol. Margaret is visited by Van Alden and Eli, each seeking a different side of her story as to the death of Hans Schroeder.

Main cast 
 Steve Buscemi as Enoch "Nucky" Thompson 
 Michael Pitt as James "Jimmy" Darmody 
 Kelly Macdonald as Margaret Schroeder/Thompson 
 Michael Shannon as Nelson Van Alden
 Shea Whigham as Elias "Eli" Thompson
 Aleksa Palladino as Angela Darmody
 Michael Stuhlbarg as Arnold Rothstein
 Stephen Graham as Al Capone
 Vincent Piazza as Charles Luciano 
 Paz de la Huerta as Lucy Danziger, Nucky's mistress
 Anthony Laciura as Edward Anselm "Eddie" Kessler, Nucky's assistant and butler.
 Paul Sparks as Mieczyslaw "Mickey Doyle" Kuzik, a bootlegger and former associate of Nucky's.
 Dabney Coleman as "Commodore" Louis Kaestner, Nucky's mentor and predecessor in Atlantic City.

Plot 
At Colosimo's funeral in Chicago, Capone and Torrio are questioned by reporters about the circumstances surrounding his murder. Back in Atlantic City, Nelson Van Alden, a newly minted investigator with the Bureau of Prohibition, questions Nucky about the robbery he is investigating, revealing his suspicions that Hans Schroeder was framed for the crime. Nucky's refusal to cooperate with the investigation leads Van Alden to look into his activities; Alden's report to his superiors reveals the extent to which Nucky extorts and controls every business, political office, public department, and criminal outfit in Atlantic City.

At Nucky's direction, Eli visits Margaret in the hospital and delivers an envelope of cash, while making a subtle threat to have her children taken into state custody unless she lies to Van Alden about her husband being involved in bootlegging. Nucky confronts Mickey in jail and explains that his bootlegging operation is being turned over to the black mob headed by Albert "Chalky" White on account of Mickey proving himself too untrustworthy to handle it. Jimmy buys expensive Christmas gifts for his family with his cut from the robbery. Capone beats a reporter who tries to interview him at Torrio's club.

In New York, Luciano brings in Frankie Yale to be questioned by Rothstein about his role in Colosimo's death. Jimmy visits his mother Gillian, a middle-aged showgirl, and presents her with an expensive necklace to replace the one she had sold years earlier to support him when they were abandoned by Jimmy's father. When Jimmy shows up for work, Nucky confronts him about the robbery. Jimmy confesses his involvement and is fired on the spot, with Nucky giving him two days to come up with an additional $3,000. Rothstein telephones Nucky and demands $100,000 to cover his losses from the robbery and for the murder of one of the drivers, who happens to be his sister-in-law's nephew. Nucky refuses and threatens to have him killed if he ever returns to Atlantic City. Van Alden visits Margaret and tells her he believes her husband was not involved in the robbery, questioning her about her involvement with Nucky.

Nucky visits his political mentor, "Commodore" Louis Kaestner, who humiliates his black maid to mock the idea of women's suffrage. After Van Alden writes home to his wife, he takes a hair ribbon he had stolen from Margaret and smells it to satiate his lust for her. Margaret visits Nucky and returns the money Eli gave her. They discuss Nucky's late wife, Margaret's financial situation, her request that Nucky help her find a job to support her children, and Margaret's enthusiasm for reading, which impresses him. Jimmy, short $500 and unable to get Capone to loan him the rest, steals the necklace from his mother and pawns it to pay Nucky back. Nucky then demonstrates the power he now holds over Jimmy by betting, and losing, the entire $3,000 in a roulette game. Elsewhere, one of Rothstein's men, alive but badly wounded, stumbles across a businessman getting sexually pleasured in his car outside Atlantic City.

Production
The episode was written by series creator and executive producer Terence Winter and directed by executive producer Tim Van Patten. This is Van Patten's first directional episode of the series. He would go on to direct additional episodes, including "Broadway Limited", "Family Limitation" and the season finale, "A Return to Normalcy".

The story about Big Jim Colosimo's death is the one non-fictional story in The Ivory Tower. As seen in the pilot, Frankie Yale murders Jim on orders from Johnny Torrio. It was widely believed that Torrio ordered Colosimo's killing so that he and the Chicago mob could enter the lucrative bootlegging business, which Colosimo opposed out of a fervent belief that bootlegging was not worth the heat it would bring from law enforcement.

Reception

Critical reception 
IGN gave the episode a score of 8 out of 10, calling it "...an episode that is in some ways better than the pilot." They continued by praising Buscemi's performance as Nucky by saying: "Here, Buscemi effortlessly switches between silver-tongued politician and two-steps-ahead gangster, and in doing so eliminates any previous doubt that Nucky is not as formidable a presence as Tony Soprano."

Ratings 
Ratings for "The Ivory Tower" fell to 3.329 million viewers in its original telecast. However, if the repeat-telecast that night is included, the total viewer count reaches 4.4 million.

References

External links 
 "The Ivory Tower" at HBO
 

2010 American television episodes
Boardwalk Empire episodes
Television episodes directed by Tim Van Patten
Television episodes written by Terence Winter